The Centre for Development of Imaging Technology (C-DIT) was established by the government of Kerala in 1988 for the advancement of research, development and training in imaging technology. C-DIT has four groups, each specialising in a core area, viz. Communication Group, Technology Group, Education & Training Group and Operations Group. C-DIT functions as a provider to the departments and agencies under the government of Kerala in the areas of ICT applications and in supply of holography based security products.

Location
C-DIT is situated near the campus of Chithranjali Hills, beside the Kerala State Film Development Corporation campus in Trivandrum, Kerala, India.

Divisions
Information Systems Division

	Web Services Team
	Open Source Technology Team
	Software Engineering Team

Technology Division
	Optical Image Processing Team
	Technology Extension Team 
	Communication Training Team

E-Governance and Research & Development Division
	E-Governance Team >>
	Research and Development Team
	Computational Linguistic Team

Visual Communication Division
	Advertisement Film Team 
	Video Documentary Team >
	Sutharykeralam and News Services
	Educational Informatics and New Media Team

Cybersri

References

Arts and Science colleges in Kerala
1988 establishments in Kerala
Colleges in Thiruvananthapuram